Alfredo Saldívar Medina (born 9 February 1990) is a Mexican professional footballer who plays as a goalkeeper.

Career

Youth
Saldívar joined the youth academy of Club Universidad Nacional in 2007. Which he than continued through UNAM Youth Academy successfully going through UNAM Premier, Pumas Morelos, and U-20. Until finally reaching the first team, Guillermo Vázquez being the coach promoting Saldívar to first team.

UNAM
Saldívar made his professional debut in the Liga MX against Monterrey ending in a 5–2 loss.

Toluca
After playing in Pumas all his career. On 4 July 2020, Saldívar signed for Liga MX club Toluca.

References

External links
 
 

1990 births
Living people
Footballers from Mexico City
Mexican footballers
Association football goalkeepers
Club Universidad Nacional footballers
Deportivo Toluca F.C. players